The rivière à Idas (English: Idas River) is a tributary of the north bank of the upper part of the Bras du Nord-Ouest, flowing entirely in the town of Baie-Saint-Paul, in the Charlevoix Regional County Municipality, in the administrative region of Capitale-Nationale, in the province of Quebec, in Canada.

This valley is mainly served by a forest road going up the right bank of the watercourse, as well as by the chemin du rang de Saint-Placide Sud. Forestry is the main economic activity in this valley; recreational tourism, second.

The surface of the river in Idas is generally frozen from the beginning of December until the beginning of April; however, safe circulation on the ice is generally done from mid-December to the end of March. The water level of the river varies with the seasons and the precipitation; the spring flood generally occurs in April.

Geography 
The Idas river rises at the mouth of Idas Lake. The mouth of this landlocked lake is located at the bottom of a bay east of the lake, either:
  west of a mountain peak;
  south-east of Montagne du Lac à Ange;
  north-east of a curve of the Sainte-Anne River;
  north-west of the village center of Saint-Cassien-des-Caps located along route 138;
  west of the northwest shore of the St. Lawrence River;
  south of the mouth of the Bras du Nord-Ouest (confluence with the Rivière du Gouffre), or in downtown Baie-Saint-Paul.

  towards the south-east in a deep valley and forming a loop towards the south in the middle of the segment to go around a mountain, until the discharge (coming from the north) of a small lake;
  towards the east in a less and less steep valley, forming some serpentines and cutting the path of Rang de Saint-Placide Sud, to its mouth.

The Idas river flows on the north bank of the Bras du Nord-Ouest, in the city of Baie-Saint-Paul. This mouth is located at:
  south of the village center of Saint-Placide-de-Charlevoix;
  west of route 138;
  north-west of the Saint-Jean mountain peak;
  north-east of the course of the Sainte-Anne River;
  southwest of the mouth of the Bras du Nord-Ouest (confluence with the rivière du Gouffre), i.e. in downtown Baie-Saint-Paul;
  west of the northwest shore of the St. Lawrence River.

Toponymy 
This toponymic designation appears on the map "Domaine forestier du Séminaire de Québec", 1955–01. It also appears on the cards of the Ruisseau du Pied du Mont number 309 and Lac des Fourches number 308 clubs of the Séminaire de Québec. This toponym evokes the memory of a hunter who once frequented the area. Toponymic variants of the official name: Bras de Saint-Joseph, Bras Saint-Joseph, Bras Saint-Placide, Discharge from the Idas Cup.

The toponym “Rivière à Idas” was formalized on March 25, 1997 at the Place Names Bank of the Commission de toponymie du Québec.

Notes and references

Appendices

Related articles 
 Charlevoix Regional County Municipality
 Baie-Saint-Paul, a city
 Bras du Nord-Ouest (Gouffre River tributary)
 Rivière du Gouffre
 St. Lawrence River
 List of rivers of Quebec

External links 

Rivers of Capitale-Nationale
Charlevoix Regional County Municipality